Elymus athericus, the sea couch, is a species of perennial grass in the family Poaceae (true grasses). They have a self-supporting growth form and simple, broad leaves. Individuals can grow to 65 cm tall. The species is invasive to the Mont Saint-Michel bay and has altered the area's ecology.

Sources

References 

athericus
Flora of Malta